Best Bet is a 2007 Hong Kong comedy television series produced by TVB and starring Michael Tse, Linda Chung, Wayne Lai and Anne Heung. The series was Tse's first leading television role and aired from 12 February to 9 March 2007 on TVB's operated channel, Jade.

Synopsis
Ho Yee (Michael Tse) is a compulsive gambler who also has luck on his side. On one occasion he gambled for three days straight and collapsed on the streets. Sheila To (Linda Chung) helps him up and soon he falls in love with her. Sheila's father is also a compulsive gambler who borrowed a large sum of money from loan sharks. To help her father out, Sheila was forced to marry Yee in order to repay her father's debt.

Yee's childhood best friend turned enemy, Tsang Tak-shing (Wayne Lai), is always around to compete with Yee. One day, Yee gambles with Tak-shing, causing Yee to lose his whole family fortune. Will he be able to regain his family's trust and wealth and lose his addiction to gambling?

Cast
Michael Tse as Ho Yee, the series' protagonist, an heir of a wealthy family who was spoiled by his parents, leading him to become a compulsive gambler and does not engage in a serious profession. Yee always had high streaks of luck, often winning in gambling matches, but despite so, gambling eventually led to his downfall.
Linda Chung as Sheila To, a philanthropist who studied overseas in the west and greatly despises gambling. She marries Yee in order to help her father repay his gambling debts.
Wayne Lai as Tsang Tak-shing, the series' antagonist, Yee's nemesis who used to be his childhood friend until one time, Tak-shing framed Yee for drooling onto a painting of a beautiful woman during class time, resulting the latter to be punished by their teacher, while in actuality, it was Tak-shing, who drooled at it due to his foot fetishism.
Anne Heung as Kong Ma-lei, born Kong Siu-wai, Yee's petty young cousin on whom Tak-shing has a crush.
Wilson Tsui as To Chai-sam, Sheila's father who is also a compulsive gambler.
Casper Chan as Ho Hei, Yee's younger half-sister who is intellectually disabled.
Kwok Fung as Ho Nin, Yee and Hei's father who is the owner of a major pawn shop.
Gordon Liu as Tsang Tai-lik, Tak-shing's father and the owner of Hung Fuk Casino.
Ngo Ka-nin as Tsang Tak-kin, Tak-shing's younger brother who is educated and well-mannered.
Gill Mohindepaul Singh as Kam Po, a physician.
Carlo Ng as Pak Fung, a restaurateur and a good friend of Yee's.

Viewership ratings

Awards and nominations
TVB Anniversary Awards (2007)
Nominated: Best Drama

References

External links
TVB.com Best Bet - Official Website 
SPCNET.tv Best Bet - Reviews

TVB dramas
2007 Hong Kong television series debuts
2007 Hong Kong television series endings
Hong Kong comedy television series
Period television series
Television shows about gambling
Costume drama television series
Television series set in the Qing dynasty
2000s Hong Kong television series
Television shows set in Guangdong